This list of fictional rodents in animation is subsidiary to the list of fictional animals and the list of fictional rodents, covering all rodents including beavers, chipmunks, gophers, mice, squirrels, rats and porcupines, as well as extinct or prehistoric species (such as Ceratogaulus), which have appeared in animation.

Beavers

Hamsters

Mice

Rats

Squirrels

Other

References

Rodents
Rodents